This is a list of the National Register of Historic Places listings in Lincoln County, Maine.

This is intended to be a complete list of the properties and districts on the National Register of Historic Places in Lincoln County, Maine, United States.  Latitude and longitude coordinates are provided for many National Register properties and districts; these locations may be seen together in a map.

There are 104 properties and districts listed on the National Register in the county, including 3 National Historic Landmarks.  An additional three properties were once listed on the register, but have since been delisted.

Current listings

|}

Former listings

|}

See also

 List of National Historic Landmarks in Maine
 National Register of Historic Places listings in Maine

References

Lincoln